Warnakulasuriya Milroy Surgeus Fernando is a Sri Lankan politician, a member of the Parliament of Sri Lanka and a government minister.

See also
 Cabinet of Sri Lanka

References
 

1944 births
Candidates in the 2019 Sri Lankan presidential election
Government ministers of Sri Lanka
Living people
Members of the 9th Parliament of Sri Lanka
Members of the 10th Parliament of Sri Lanka
Members of the 11th Parliament of Sri Lanka
Members of the 12th Parliament of Sri Lanka
Members of the 13th Parliament of Sri Lanka
Members of the 14th Parliament of Sri Lanka
Social affairs ministers of Sri Lanka
Sri Lanka Freedom Party politicians
Sri Lankan Roman Catholics
United People's Freedom Alliance politicians